In mathematics, a representation on coordinate rings is a representation of a group on coordinate rings of affine varieties.

Let X be an affine algebraic variety over an algebraically closed field k of characteristic zero with the action of a reductive algebraic group G. G then acts on the coordinate ring  of X as a left regular representation: . This is a representation of G on the coordinate ring of X.

The most basic case is when X is an affine space (that is, X is a finite-dimensional representation of G) and the coordinate ring is a polynomial ring. The most important case is when X is a symmetric variety; i.e., the quotient of G by a fixed-point subgroup of an involution.

Isotypic decomposition 
Then there is a direct sum decomposition:

where the sum runs over all simple G-modules . The existence of the decomposition follows, for example, from the fact that the group algebra of G is semisimple since G is reductive.

X is called multiplicity-free (or spherical variety) if every irreducible representation of G appears at most one time in the coordinate ring; i.e., .
For example,  is multiplicity-free as -module. More precisely, given a closed subgroup H of G, define

by setting  and then extending  by linearity. Then there is a direct sum decomposition of -modules (N the normalizer of H)
,
which is an algebraic version of the Peter–Weyl theorem (and in fact the analytic version is an immediate consequence.) We can assume . Let  be the linear functional of W such that . Then .
That is, the image of  contains  and the opposite inclusion holds since  is equivariant.

Examples 
Let  be a B-eigenvector and X the closure of the orbit . It is an affine variety called the highest weight vector variety by Vinberg–Popov. It is multiplicity-free.

The Kostant–Rallis situation

See also 
Algebra representation

Notes

References 
 

Group theory
Representation theory
Representation theory of groups